The Democratic Coalition was a coalition of three Greek political parties for the elections of 1936.

Members to the coalition were:
 Progressive Party
 Democratic Socialist Party of Greece
 Agricultural and Labour Party

Defunct political party alliances in Greece